Calopogonium is a genus of flowering plants in the legume family, Fabaceae. It belongs to the subfamily Faboideae.
Calopogunium mucunoides is a vine that was introduced into Australia as a pasture legume. It has become naturalized in disturbed sites, waste areas and crops along roadsides and waterways and on the edges of rainforests in the wetter tropical regions of Northern Australia. It is most common in the Darwin region and in surrounding bush land and has also become a weed in Kakadu National Park. In these areas, populations are extending rapidly and it has been observed to form dense mats that smother native vegetarian.

Vigorous, creeping and twining, hairy herb forming a tangled mass of foliage 30 to 40 cm deep. Stems succulent, covered with long brown hairs, creeping in lower part; root at nodes which come in contact with the soil; upper part of stem becomes twining. Leaves trifoliate; leaflets hairy on both surfaces, smaller than those of Pueraria phaseoloides; terminal leaflet broadly ovate to ovate-rhomboid, lateral ones are obliquely broadly ovate, about to 4 to 5 cm long and a little less in width. Stipules small and triangular; small flowers borne in short axillary racemes of four to eight to 12 on hairy peduncles. Flowers blue with greenish-yellow blotch. Pods linear, compressed, 2.5 to 4 cm long, yellowish brown, densely covered with long erect hairs, four- to eight-seeded.

References

External links 

Phaseoleae
Fabaceae genera